Pierre Schmitt (born 19 December 1965) is a French ice hockey player. He competed in the men's tournament at the 1988 Winter Olympics.

References

1965 births
Living people
Olympic ice hockey players of France
Ice hockey players at the 1988 Winter Olympics
Place of birth missing (living people)